Microhydrodytes is a genus of predaceous diving beetles in the family Dytiscidae. There is one described species in Microhydrodytes, M. elachistus. It is found in the Neotropics.

References

Further reading

 
 
 

Dytiscidae